Sopade (also written SoPaDe) was the name of the board of directors of the exile organization of the Social Democratic Party of Germany (SPD). It operated in Prague from 1933 to 1938, from 1938 to 1940 in Paris, and, until 1945, in London.

History
After the occupation of the trade union houses by the Nazis on 2 May 1933, the party executive committee decided that some particularly endangered members of the board would immediately have to flee from the grasp of the Nazis. Otto Wels, Paul Hertz, Friedrich Stampfer, Erich Ollenhauer and others were assigned to build up a foreign party structure in Prague.

When the Sopade could not reach an agreement with the remaining party executive committee in Berlin about acting with Paul Löbe against Hitler's peace resolution, which was interpreted as sanctioning the fascist foreign policy by the SPD, nothing could prevent the break between Berlin and Prague, which came two weeks later, in mid-May 1933. Because of the final Nazi prohibition of the SPD on 22 June 1933, it no longer came to a split between the home and foreign SPD.

Under pressure from the intra-party opposition groups Neu Beginnen and Revolutionäre Sozialisten Deutschlands, the Sopade in 1934 published the Prague Manifesto, penned by Rudolf Hilferding. This document called for the revolutionary overthrow of the Hitler regime.

With the cooperation of Rudolf Hilferding, the Sopade published Germany Reports through a secret correspondence system. These dealt with the situation in Nazi Germany. The reports appeared in published form from April/May 1934 to December 1936 under the title Germany Report of the Sopade, from January 1937 until April 1940 under the title of “Germany Reports of the Social-Democratic Party of Germany (Sopade)”, by order of the executive committee in exile of the SPD, edited by Erich Rinner, until March 1938 in Prague, from May 1938 in Paris.

In 1945, the Allied occupants in the Western zones initially allowed four parties to be established, including the re-establishment of the SPD.

Secretaries
 Franz Bögler (1902–1976)
 Hans Dill (1887–1973)
 Gustav Ferl (1890–1970)
 Richard Hansen (1887–1976)
 Willy Lange (1899–nach 1949)
 Georg Reinbold (1885–1946)
 Erwin Schoettle (1899–1976)
 Ernst Schumacher (1896–1958)
 Emil Stahl (1879–1956)
 Otto Thiele (1896–??)
 Waldemar von Knoeringen (1906–1971)

See also 
 Union of German Socialist Organisations in Great Britain

Bibliography
German Reports of the Sopade. From the copy in the “Archives of Social Democracy” of the Friedrich Ebert Foundation given change and with a register provided by Klaus Behnken in the Petra Netelbeck publishing house, Salzhausen and Zweitausendeins, Frankfurt am Main, 1980 (7 volumes).

External links
 Online publication: Socialist reports released by the SOPADE, 1939 - 1948
Diaspora organizations of political parties
Organizations established in 1933
Organizations disestablished in 1945
Socialist organisations in Germany
Social Democratic Party of Germany